Winter Ballades is an EP by Nami Tamaki.

CD track listing
"Promise"
"Christmas Time"
"Winter Fall"
"Promise" (Instrumental)

Limited edition DVD track listing
"Promise" (video clip)

External links
www.tamakinami.com (Japanese)

2007 debut EPs
Nami Tamaki albums